Shaw House, also known as the Old Shaw Homestead, is a historic home located near Southern Pines, Moore County, North Carolina. It is dated to the early-19th century, and is a -story, three bay, frame dwelling with Federal / Greek Revival style design elements.  The house has massive, single-shoulder, dressed sandstone and brick end chimneys, a gable roof, and full-width engaged front porch.  It has a rear ell added in the late-19th or early-20th century.  Shaw House is thought to be one of the oldest surviving houses in Moore County.

It was added to the National Register of Historic Places in 1993.

References

Houses on the National Register of Historic Places in North Carolina
Federal architecture in North Carolina
Greek Revival houses in North Carolina
Houses completed in 1842
Houses in Moore County, North Carolina
National Register of Historic Places in Moore County, North Carolina